The National Historic Landmarks in Arkansas represent Arkansas's history from the Louisiana Purchase through the Civil War and the Civil Rights Movement. It contains the landmarks designated by the U.S. Federal Government for the U.S. state of Arkansas.  There are 17 National Historic Landmarks (NHLs) in Arkansas.  Another NHL was formerly listed in the state but was moved to Oakland, California.

This page includes a list of National Park Service-administered historic areas in Arkansas.

National Historic Landmarks
This is a complete list of the 17 National Historic Landmarks in Arkansas.

|}

Historic areas administered by the National Park Service
National Historic Sites, National Historical Parks, National Monuments, and certain other areas listed in the National Park system are historic landmarks of national importance that are highly protected already, often before the inauguration of the NHL program in 1960, and are then often not also named NHLs per se.  There are four of these in Arkansas.  The National Park Service lists these four together with the NHLs in the state,  The Arkansas Post National Memorial, the Fort Smith National Historic Site (shared with Oklahoma) and the Little Rock Central High School National Historic Site are also NHLs and are listed above.  The remaining one is:

Other National Park Service-administered areas in Arkansas are the Buffalo National River and the Hot Springs National Park (not historic per se but which includes Bathhouse Row, an NHL listed above).

See also
National Register of Historic Places listings in Arkansas
List of National Historic Landmarks by state

References

External links 

 National Historic Landmarks Program, at National Park Service

Arkansas
 
National Historic Landmarks
National Historic Landmarks